Vincent Guastaferro (born April 6, 1950) is an American film, stage and television actor. He is known for playing the recurring role of Sgt. Vincent Agostini in the American police procedural television series NYPD Blue.

Born in Jersey City, New Jersey, he was the son of Regina Blake and Arcangelo Guastaferro. Guastaferro was also the brother of Thomas and sister of Elizabeth Ann Guastaferro.  He attended at the University of Toledo, where he earned the Bachelor of Fine Arts degree. Guastaferro then attended at The Theatre School at DePaul University, where he earned the Master of Fine Arts degree. He began his career in 1979, first appearing on the stage production of Sexual Perversity in Chicago, where he served as the replacement of actor, comedian and musician Jim Belushi.

In his stage career, Guastaferro made numerous appearances to playwright, filmmaker and author David Mamet's stage plays. In 1980, he made his film and television debut, first appearing in the drama television series Lou Grant. Guastaferro then made an appearance to the 1981 film King of the Mountain, where he played the role of a gang member. He guest-starred in television programs including Home Improvement, Becker, What's Happening Now!!, Hardcastle and McCormick, CSI: NY, Melrose Place, Hunter, The West Wing and Brooklyn South. He played the recurring role of John Kousakis in the crime drama television series Wiseguy. From 1993 to 1997, Guastaferro played the recurring role of Sgt. Vincent Agostini in NYPD Blue. In 1997, he played the role of a friend which was Joey of the leading character in the stage play The Old Neighborhood. Guastaferro continued appearing in numerous stage plays.

In his film career, Guastaferro played the role of Deputy Rick Cologne in the 1986 film Friday the 13th Part VI: Jason Lives. He then played Paulie in the 1989 film Next of Kin. Guastaferro appeared in films such as Things Change, Eyes of an Angel, Touch Me, Nothing in Common, State and Main, and Trouble Bound. He played the role of Lt. Senna in the 1991 film Homicide. His final film credit was from the 2012 film An Old Man’s Gold.

References

External links 

Rotten Tomatoes profile

1950 births
Living people
People from Jersey City, New Jersey
Male actors from Jersey City, New Jersey
Male actors from New Jersey
American male film actors
American male stage actors
American male television actors
20th-century American male actors
21st-century American male actors
University of Toledo alumni
DePaul University alumni